"When We Was Fab" is a song by English musician George Harrison, which he released on his 1987 album Cloud Nine. It was also issued as the second single from the album, in January 1988. The lyrics serve as a nostalgic reflection by Harrison on the days of Beatlemania during the 1960s, when the Beatles were first referred to as "the Fab Four". Harrison co-wrote the song with Jeff Lynne, who also co-produced the track. The recording references the psychedelic sound that the Beatles had helped popularise in 1967, through its use of sitar, cello, and backwards-relayed effects. Harrison's former Beatles bandmate Ringo Starr is among the other musicians on the track. The single was accompanied by an innovative music video, directed by the partnership of Kevin Godley and Lol Creme. One of Harrison's most popular songs, "When We Was Fab" has appeared on the compilations Best of Dark Horse 1976–1989 (1989) and Let It Roll (2009).

Music
"When We Was Fab" has similarities to songs by the Beatles, such as "I Am the Walrus" (1967). The fadeout contains a nod to the melody of "Drive My Car".  It uses a string quartet and psychedelic effects as did many Beatles songs.

Release
In the United Kingdom, it peaked at number 25 on the UK Singles Chart, and in the United States, the song peaked at number 23 on Billboard magazine's Hot 100 chart. It was Harrison's last top 40 hit in the US, and the second such hit in which the lyrics reflect on his years as a Beatle – the other being "All Those Years Ago" (1981).

Cash Box said that "Harrison and Jeff Lynne unveil a historical re-creation of the Beatles' career wrapped up in one song. Complete with cellos, George Martin-like edits, sitars, and time machine. Sounds like a Beatles song circa Magical Mystery Tour.".

In 2010, AOL radio listeners chose "When We Was Fab" as one of the 10 Best George Harrison Songs, placing it number 9 on the list.

Track listings
7" W8131
"When We Was Fab" – 3:59
"Zig Zag" – 2:45
12" W8131T, 12" picture disc W8131TP, 3" CD W8131CD
"When We Was Fab" (unextended version)
"Zig Zag" – 2:45
"That's the Way It Goes" (remix)
"When We Was Fab" (reverse end)

Cover art
The single cover incorporates Klaus Voormann's 1966 line drawing of Harrison, which was used in the album art for the Beatles's 1966 album Revolver, and on which the letters ER from the title are visible, along with a similar, updated drawing of Harrison 22 years later.

Music video
The music video that accompanied the song was directed by Godley & Creme. It features a many-armed Harrison busking in front of a brick wall, as numerous people on the street pass him by, including many British musicians with whom Harrison had previously collaborated. Most prominent amongst these are Ringo Starr, who appears first as Harrison's roadie and then as a drummer, and Jeff Lynne, both of whom also played on the track. Elton John makes an appearance, putting a coin in Harrison's cup, as does percussionist Ray Cooper, and Neil Aspinall, the Beatles' former road manager, assistant, and later head of Apple Corps, holding a copy of John Lennon's 1971 Imagine album. Paul McCartney was for a long time rumoured to have appeared in the walrus suit, playing the bass, after Harrison stated in a televised interview that it was indeed McCartney in the video, "but he was camera shy that day and he kept his walrus mask on." The bassist in the video is playing left handed, thus implying that it is at least intended as a reference to McCartney; however, in a 1995 interview, McCartney said, "George wanted me to be in it but I wasn't available. So I suggested that he put someone else in the walrus and tell everyone that it was me." Though Paul Simon has been rumoured to be the figure pushing a cart, in 2020 director Kevin Godley told the Nothing Is Real podcast he had no recollection of Simon being involved. Co-director Lol Creme similarly denied Simon's involvement in the video, stating that he had never met Paul Simon.

The video includes numerous visual metaphors and references to Harrison's time with the Beatles, including a green apple (the logo of Apple Records, the Beatles' label), Harrison wearing his distinctive outfit from the cover of Sgt. Pepper's Lonely Hearts Club Band, and having multiple arms, evoking the many-armed gods of Hindu traditions.

The video received six nominations at the 1988 MTV Video Music Awards, including best art director for Sid Bartholomew.

Personnel
George Harrison – lead vocals, acoustic and electric guitars, keyboards, sitar, backing vocals
Jeff Lynne – bass guitar, keyboards, backing vocals
Gary Wright – piano
Ringo Starr – drums, backing vocals
Bobby Kok – cello

Chart performance

External links
 George Harrison - When We Was Fab at Graham Calkin's Beatles Pages.

References

1987 songs
1988 singles
George Harrison songs
Songs written by George Harrison
Songs written by Jeff Lynne
Song recordings produced by Jeff Lynne
Song recordings produced by George Harrison
Music videos directed by Godley and Creme
Albums with cover art by Klaus Voormann
Music published by Oops Publishing and Ganga Publishing, B.V.
Dark Horse Records singles
Songs about the Beatles
Songs about nostalgia
Psychedelic rock songs